Guapira rotundifolia is a species of plant in the Nyctaginaceae family. It is endemic to Jamaica.

References

Nyctaginaceae
Near threatened plants
Endemic flora of Jamaica
Taxonomy articles created by Polbot